The 17th Quebec Legislature was the provincial legislature that existed in Quebec, Canada from May 16, 1927, to July 30, 1931. The Liberal Party, led by Louis-Alexandre Taschereau as Premier of Quebec had a majority of seats in the Legislative Assembly of Quebec and was the governing party.

Seats per political party

 After the 1927 elections

Member list

This was the list of members of the Legislative Assembly of Quebec that were elected in the 1927 election:

Other elected MLAs

Other MLAs were elected during by-elections in this term

 Pierre Gagnon, Liberal Party, Kamouraska, October 31, 1927
 Pierre Gauthier, Liberal Party, Portneuf, October 31, 1927
 Amédée Caron, Liberal Party, Iles-de-la-Madeleine, July 14, 1928
 Oscar Drouin, Liberal Party, Québec-Est, October 24, 1928
 Camillien Houde, Conservative Party, Montréal-Sainte-Marie, October 24, 1928
 Adélard Godbout, Liberal Party, L'Islet, May 13, 1929
 Andrew Ross McMaster, Liberal Party, Compton, September 30, 1929
 Avila Turcotte, Liberal Party, Richelieu, October 28, 1929
 Joseph-Léonide Perron, Liberal Party, Montcalm, November 16, 1929
 Joseph-Édouard Fortin, Liberal Party, Beauce, December 9, 1929
 Robert Taschereau, Liberal Party, Bellechasse, October 20, 1930
 Paul Sauvé, Conservative Party, Deux-Montagnes, November 4, 1930
 Martin Beattie Fisher, Conservative Party, Huntingdon, November 4, 1930
 Louis-Joseph Thisdel, Liberal Party, Maskinongé, November 4, 1930

Cabinet Ministers

 Prime Minister and Executive Council President: Louis-Alexandre Taschereau
 Agriculture: Joseph-Édouard Caron (1927-1929), Joseph-Léonide Perron (1929-1930), Adélard Godbout (1930-1931)
 Colonization, Mines and Fishing: Joseph-Édouard Perrault (1927-1929), Hector Laferté (1929-1930)
 Colonization, Hunting and Fishing: Hector Laferté (1929-1930)
 Mines: Joseph-Édouard Perrault (1930-1931)
 Public Works and Labour: Antonin Galipeault (1927-1930), Joseph-Napoléon Francoeur (1930-1931)
 Lands and Forests: Honoré Mercier Jr 
 Roads: Joseph-Léonide Perron (1927-1929), Joseph-Édouard Perrault (1929-1931)
 Municipal Affairs: Louis-Alexandre Taschereau
 Attorney General: Louis-Alexandre Taschereau 
 Provincial secretary: Athanase David 
 Treasurer: Jacob Nicol (1927-1929), Andrew Ross McMaster (1929-1930), Gordon Wallace Scott (1930), Louis-Alexandre Taschereau (1930-1931)
 Members without portfolios: Joseph-Charles-Ernest Ouellet (1929-1931), Narcisse Pérodeau (1929-1931), Gordon Wallace Scott (1930-1931)

New electoral districts

The electoral map was reformed in 1930 and the new map was first used in the general election of August 24, 1931.

 Gaspé was split into two ridings: Gaspé-Nord and Gaspé-Sud.
 Gatineau was created from parts of Hull.
 Laviolette was created from parts of Champlain.
 Roberval was created from parts of Lac-Saint-Jean
 Rivière-du-Loup was created from parts of Témiscouata.

References

Sources
 1927 election results
 List of historical Cabinet Ministers

17